A registrar is an official keeper of records made in a register. The term may refer to:

Education
 Registrar (education), an official in an academic institution who handles student records
 Registrar of the University of Oxford, one of the senior officials of the university.

Government records
 Registrar (law), the official in charge of a court registry, usually a judicial appointment
 Registrar of Companies, India
 Registrar general, government officer in Britain and Commonwealth nations concerned with civil registration
 Registrar General's Department, the Government of Ghana agency responsible for the registration of companies and business
 Registrar of the treasury, an office of the United States Treasury Department
 County registrar, an official of the Irish Circuit Court who carries out quasi-judicial and administrative functions
 Office of the Registrar of Indigenous Corporations, an Australian Government statutory office
 Superintendent Registrar, the senior official at a Register office (United Kingdom)

Canada
 Registrar General of Canada, responsible for registering all documents issued under the Great Seal of Canada or the Privy Seal of Canada
 Registrar of Imported Vehicles, a program to help regulate Canada Motor Vehicle Safety Standards

Medicine
 Specialist registrar, a medical doctor in the United Kingdom receiving advanced training in a specialist field
 Senior registrar, type of medical or dental practitioner in the UK, Ireland, and Australia
 Specialty registrar, new training grade intended to replace specialist registrar

Technology and telecommunication
 Registrar (software), software used in the personnel or human resources (HR) area of businesses
 Domain name registrar, a company authorized to register Internet domain names
Drop registrar, a domain name registrar who registers expiring Internet domain names
 Pool Registrar, a component of the reliable server pooling in software design
 SIP registrar, a Session Initiation Protocol endpoint that accepts REGISTER requests

Other uses 
 Registrar (Church of England), an ecclesiastical office
 Registrar (museum), responsible for implementing policies and procedures that relate to caring for collections
 The British term for a stock transfer agent

See also
 Register (disambiguation)
 Registrar of Copyrights (disambiguation)
 Registry (disambiguation)